Caeau Cnwch a Ty'n-y-graig is a Site of Special Scientific Interest in Brecknock, Powys, Wales. It occupies sloping ground on the south west side of Pen-y-garreg Reservoir in the Elan Valley.

Caeau Cnwch a Ty'n-y-graig comprises four traditionally managed fields in a small valley below Craig Cnwch, near Elan Village.
They provide a type of herb-rich grassland that is characteristic of the upland fringe of central Wales.

See also
List of Sites of Special Scientific Interest in Brecknock

Sites of Special Scientific Interest in Brecknock